Muhammad ("Chapter of Muhammad") is the 47th chapter (surah) of the Quran with 38 verses (ayat).

The title is derived from the direct mentioning of the Islamic prophet Muhammad in 47:2. It also has the name of Al-Qitāl, which translates to fighting due to the context of the sura. This sura pertains to a specific conflict that arose from people prohibiting the acceptance and spread of Islam. It refers to the Battle of Badr, where an army was being gathered to attack Medina. The Battle of Badr took place during Ramadan, in year 2 of the Islamic calendar.

Summary
1 The works of those who oppose Islam shall come to naught
2-3 True believers shall receive the expiation of their sins
4-5 How enemies of Islam are to be treated in war
6-8 God will reward those who fight for Islam
9-12 God will utterly destroy the unbelievers
13-17 The final condition of believers and infidels contrasted
18-20 Hypocrites reproved and warned
21 Muhammad commanded to ask pardon for his sins 
22-33 Cowardly Muslims and hypocrites rebuked and warned
34-36 Those who would dissuade Muslims from their duty warned
37 Muslims exhorted to boldness in warring for their faith
38 Muslims exhorted to liberality in contributing towards the expenses of holy war

See also 
 Muhammad in Islam

References

External links 
Quran 47 Clear Quran translation

Muhammad
Jihad